Harold McCord (30 July 1893 – 3 November 1957), was an American editor. He edited 8 films between 1926 and 1945.

He was born in New York City, United States and died in Hollywood, California.

External links

1893 births
1957 deaths
American film editors